Frederick George Matt Milton (21 October 1906 – August 1991) was an English water polo player and competitive swimmer who represented Great Britain at the Olympics and England at the British Empire Games during the 1930s. He was part of the British water polo team that finished eighth at the 1936 Summer Olympics. He played four matches. He was born in Marylebone, Great Britain. As a swimmer, he won a silver medal in the 4×200 yards freestyle relay at the 1930 British Empire Games in Hamilton, Ontario. In the 400-yard freestyle he finished fifth. His wife Irene Pirie-Milton and brother in law Bob Pirie were Canadian swimmers who also competed at the 1936 Olympics.

Milton married Canadian swimmer Irene Pirie; their son Hamilton Milton is a retired British Olympic swimmer.

See also
 List of Commonwealth Games medallists in swimming (men)

References

1906 births
1991 deaths
English male freestyle swimmers
English male water polo players
Olympic water polo players of Great Britain
Water polo players at the 1936 Summer Olympics
Swimmers at the 1930 British Empire Games
Commonwealth Games silver medallists for England
Commonwealth Games medallists in swimming
People from Marylebone
Medallists at the 1930 British Empire Games